Marx, Mao, Marighella, and Guevara (M3G) was an urban guerilla group active during the Brazilian military dictatorship. The group was active in Porto Alegre in 1969 and 1970, and founded by Edmur Péricles de Camargo, a former associate of Carlos Marighella.

References

1969 in Brazil
1970 in Brazil
Communism in Brazil
Far-left politics in Brazil
Defunct communist militant groups
Guerrilla movements in Latin America
Paramilitary organisations based in Brazil